Oliveria may refer to:
Utricularia sect. Oliveria, a botanical section

People with the name
Melody Oliveria or bowiechick, YouTube personality
Oliveria Prescott (1843–1919), English writer and composer
Charles Oliveira MMA fighter

See also
 Oliveira (disambiguation)
 Oliver (disambiguation)
 Olivera, a feminine name